George Zucco (11 January 1886 – 27 May 1960) was an English character actor who appeared in plays and 96 films, mostly American-made, during a career spanning over two decades, from the 1920s to 1951. In his films, he often played a suave villain, a member of nobility, or a mad doctor.

Early life and family
George Desylla Zucco was born in Manchester, Lancashire, on 11 January 1886. His mother Marian (née Rintoul) ran a dressmaking business. His father, George De Sylla Zucco, was a Greek merchant from Corfu who became a naturalised British subject in 1865.

Zucco debuted on the Canadian stage in 1908 in a stock theater company. In 1910, he entered the United States for the first time from Canada, bound for Seattle, Washington, where he soon appeared in plays such as The Melting Pot and The White Sister. He and his wife Frances toured the American vaudeville circuit during the 1910s, their satirical sketch about suffragettes earning them renown.

He returned to the UK and served as a lieutenant in the British Army's West Yorkshire Regiment during the First World War. He lost the use of two fingers when he was shot in the right arm in France. When the war ended, he studied at the Royal Academy of Dramatic Art and later taught there.

He became a leading stage actor of the 1920s, and made his film debut as Eugène Godefroy Cavaignac in The Dreyfus Case (1931), a British film dramatising the Dreyfus Affair.

Career
Zucco returned to the United States in 1935 to play Benjamin Disraeli in Victoria Regina, and appeared with Gary Cooper and George Raft in Souls at Sea (1937).

He played Professor Moriarty in The Adventures of Sherlock Holmes (1939), opposite Basil Rathbone as Sherlock Holmes and Nigel Bruce as Dr. Watson. Zucco earned a reputation as a bespectacled, nefarious character in films such as After the Thin Man, Fast Company, Arrest Bulldog Drummond, Charlie Chan in Honolulu, The Cat and the Canary, and My Favorite Blonde.

During the 1940s, he took every role he was offered, landing himself in B-films and Universal horror films, including The Mummy's Hand (1940), The Mummy's Tomb (1942), The Mad Monster (1942), The Mad Ghoul (1943), Dead Men Walk (1943), The Mummy's Ghost (1944), House of Frankenstein (1944), and Tarzan and the Mermaids (1948). He was reunited with Basil Rathbone in another Sherlock Holmes adventure, Sherlock Holmes in Washington, this time playing not Moriarty, but a Nazi spy.

Last years and death
After playing a bit part in David and Bathsheba (1951), Zucco undertook a role in The Desert Fox, but suffered a stroke one day on the set, and never significantly recovered (he was replaced by Cedric Hardwicke).  He suffered from stroke-induced dementia for the rest of his life, and he died on 27 May 1960 from pneumonia in a nursing facility in Hollywood, aged  74.

Personal life
He and his wife, Stella Francis, had a daughter, Frances (1931–1962), who died of throat cancer at age 30, and a grandson, George Zucco (né Canto). Stella Zucco died from natural causes on May 11, 1999, aged 99, in Woodland Hills, California.

Filmography

 Dreyfus (1931) as Cavaignac (film debut)
 There Goes the Bride (1932) as Prosecutor (uncredited)
 The Midshipmaid (1932) as Lord Dore
 The Good Companions (1933) as Fauntley
 The Roof (1933) as James Renton
 The Man from Toronto (1933) as Squire
 Autumn Crocus (1934) as Reverend Mayne
 Something Always Happens (1934) as Proprietor of the Maison de Paris (uncredited)
 The Lady Is Willing (1934) as Man from Reclamation Agent (uncredited)
 What Happened Then? (1934) as Inspector Hull
 What's in a Name? (1934) as Foot
 Road House (1934) as Hotel Manager (uncredited)
 Abdul the Damned (1935) as Officer of the Firing Squad
 It's a Bet (1935) as Convict (uncredited)
 The Common Round (1936, Short) as Dr. Pyke
 The Man Who Could Work Miracles (1936) as The Colonel's Butler
 Sinner Take All (1936) as Bascomb
 After the Thin Man (1936) as Dr. Kammer
 Parnell (1937) as Sir Charles Russell
 Saratoga (1937) as Dr. Harmsworth Bierd
 London by Night (1937) as Inspector Jefferson
 Souls at Sea (1937) as Barton Woodley
 The Firefly (1937) as Secret Service Chief
 Madame X (1937) as Dr. LaFarge
 The Bride Wore Red (1937) as Count Armalia
 Conquest (1937) as Sen. Malachowski (uncredited)
 Rosalie (1937) as General Maroff
 Arsène Lupin Returns (1938) as Prefect of Police
 Three Comrades (1938) as Dr. Plauten (uncredited)
 Lord Jeff (1938) as James 'Jim' Hampstead
 Fast Company (1938) as Otto Brockler
 Marie Antoinette (1938) as Governor of Conciergerie (uncredited)
 Vacation from Love (1938) as Dr. Waxton
 Suez (1938) as Prime Minister
 Arrest Bulldog Drummond (1938) as Rolf Alferson
 Charlie Chan in Honolulu (1938) as Dr. Cardigan
 Captain Fury (1939) as Arnold Trist
 The Magnificent Fraud (1939) as Dr. Luis Virgo
 The Adventures of Sherlock Holmes (1939) as Professor Moriarty
 Here I Am a Stranger (1939) as James K. Spaulding
 The Cat and the Canary (1939) as Lawyer Crosby
 The Hunchback of Notre Dame (1939) as Procurator
 New Moon (1940) as Vicomte Ribaud
 The Mummy's Hand (1940) as Andoheb
 Arise, My Love (1940) as Prison Governor
 Dark Streets of Cairo (1940) as Abbadi
 The Monster and the Girl (1941) as Dr. Parry
 Topper Returns (1941) as Dr. Jeris
 A Woman's Face (1941) as Defense Attorney
 International Lady (1941) as Webster
 Ellery Queen and the Murder Ring (1941) as Dr. Edwin L. Jannery
 My Favorite Blonde (1942) as Dr. Hugo Streger
 The Mad Monster (1942) as Dr. Cameron
 Halfway to Shanghai (1942) as Peter van Hoost
 Dr. Renault's Secret (1942) as Dr. Robert Renault
 The Mummy's Tomb (1942) as Andoheb
 The Black Swan (1942) as Lord Denby
 Dead Men Walk (1943) as Dr. Lloyd Clayton/Dr. Elwyn Clayton
 Sherlock Holmes in Washington (1943) as Stanley
 The Black Raven (1943) as Amos Bradford aka The Raven
 Holy Matrimony (1943) as Mr. Crepitude
 The Mad Ghoul (1943) as Dr. Alfred Morris
 Never a Dull Moment (1943) as Tony Rocco
 Voodoo Man (1944) as Nicholas
 The Mummy's Ghost (1944) as High Priest
 Return of the Ape Man (1944) as Ape Man (in some stills; it is not certain that he appears in any footage, however) 
 The Seventh Cross (1944) as Fahrenburg
 Shadows in the Night (1944) as Frank Swift
 House of Frankenstein (1944) as Professor Bruno Lampini
 Fog Island (1945) as Leo Grainger
 Having Wonderful Crime (1945) as King aka The Great Movel
 Sudan (1945) as Horadef
 Midnight Manhunt (1945) as Jelke
 Week-End at the Waldorf (1945) as Bey of Aribajan
 Confidential Agent (1945) as Detective Geddes
 Hold That Blonde (1945) as Dr. Pavel Storasky
 The Flying Serpent (1946) as Prof. Andrew Forbes
 Scared to Death (1947) as Dr. Joseph Van Ee
 The Imperfect Lady (1947) as Mr. Mallam
 Moss Rose (1947) as Craxton - the butler
 Lured (1947) as Officer H. R. Barrett
 Desire Me (1947) as Father Donnard
 Where There's Life (1947) as Paul Stertorius
 Captain from Castile (1947) as Marquis De Carvajal
 Tarzan and the Mermaids (1948) as Palanth - The High Priest
 Who Killed Doc Robbin (1948) as Doc Hugo Robbin
 The Pirate (1948) as The Viceroy
 Secret Service Investigator (1948) as Otto Dagoff
 Joan of Arc (1948) as Constable of Clervaux
 The Secret Garden (1949) as Dr. Fortescue
 The Barkleys of Broadway (1949) as The Judge
 Madame Bovary (1949) as DuBocage
 Harbor of Lost Men (1950) as H.G. Danziger
 Let's Dance (1950) as Judge Mackenzie
 Flame of Stamboul (1951) as The Voice
 The First Legion (1951) as Father Robert Stuart
 David and Bathsheba (1951) as Egyptian Ambassador (final film) (uncredited)

References

External links

George Zucco bio on (re)Search my Trash

1886 births
1960 deaths
Male actors from Manchester
Deaths from pneumonia in California
English male film actors
English male stage actors
English people of Greek descent
English emigrants to the United States
Vaudeville performers
Burials at Forest Lawn Memorial Park (Hollywood Hills)
20th-century English male actors
British Army personnel of World War I
West Yorkshire Regiment officers
British amputees